Oued Ksob is a river in western Morocco that discharges to the Atlantic Ocean on a broad beach slightly south of the city of Essaouira and slightly north of the village of Diabat. The mouth of the river along with the nearby Iles Purpuraires is known for sighting of the rare species Eleonora's falcon. To the south of the Ksob mouth is a ruined watchtower known as the Bordj El Berod.

References

Rivers of Morocco